Sceliphron caementarium, also known as the yellow-legged mud-dauber wasp, black-and-yellow mud dauber (within the US), or black-waisted mud-dauber (outside of the US), is a species of sphecid wasp. There are some 30 other species of Sceliphron that occur throughout the world, though in appearance and habits they are quite similar to S. caementarium.

Etymology
The Latin species name caementarius means mason or builder of walls.

Distribution and habitat
S. caementarium is widespread in Canada, the United States, Central America and the West Indies, and has been introduced to many Pacific Islands (including Australia, Hawaii, and Japan), Peru and Europe, where it has become established in some countries of the Mediterranean Basin (Croatia, France and Corsica, Italy, Cyprus, Malta, the Canary Islands, and Madeira) and Austria, and Ukraine.

This species is found in a wide variety of habitats, such as rock ledges, man-made structures, puddles and other water edges, cypress domes, in long leaf pines (Pinus palustris), and in turkey oaks.

Description

Their petiole is generally black and is about half the length of the entire abdomen, however the population in the desert southwest often has a yellow petiole. The thorax shows various yellow markings, while the abdomen is normally black, with yellow propodeum (typical of females). The eyes are black, the antennae are black, and the legs are yellow with black trochanters and femurs. Within the United States, it is the only species with yellow-marked legs. The wings are a tawny color.

Biology
The black and yellow mud daubers are solitary parasitoid wasps that build nests out of mud. These sphecid wasps collect mud balls at puddle and pool edges for constructing nests. Frequently, nests are built in shaded areas inside formations that are sheltered from the weather or from other environmental elements. These sites may be naturally-occurring, or man-made structures. Some examples are: under and inside various types of bridges, barns, garages, open-air porches, or under housing eaves. The nests comprise up to 25 vertically arranged, individual cylindrical cells. After initial creation and covering of the clutch, this sphecid wasp uses more mud as a means covering and protecting the whole cluster of cells, thereby forming a smooth appearance, and a uniform nest. The entire nest may attain an area equal to, or larger than, the size of an average human fist.

After building a cell of the nest, the female wasp captures several spiders. The captured prey are stung and paralyzed before being placed in the nest (usually 6-15 per cell), and then a single egg is deposited on the prey within each cell. The wasp then seals the cell with a thick mud plug. After finishing a series of cells, she leaves and does not return. While consuming the prey and increasing in size, the larva molts several times, until it molts into a pupa. Once the pupa has developed into an adult wasp, the adult emerges from its pupal case and breaks out of its mud chamber.

Adults can be seen in mid-summer feeding on nectar at flowers, especially Queen Anne's lace (Daucus carota), parsnips and water parsnips (Sium suave, Sium latifolium, Berula erecta). They have a low reproductive rate. Stings are rare due to their solitary and usually nonaggressive nature; however, nests are aggressively defended.

A common species of cuckoo wasp, Chrysis angolensis, is frequently a cleptoparasite in Sceliphron nests, and is only one of many different insects that parasitize these mud daubers.

Venom
Although they are common components of venoms, serotonin, histamine, acetylcholine, and kinins are absent from S. caementarium venom.

Mentions in popular media
In 1996, Birgenair Flight 301 crashed near Puerto Rico. The most probable cause of this Boeing 757 crash was a blockage in a Pitot tube (device for air speed measurement) by a mud dauber's nest.

Gallery

References

Further reading
Ascher J.S., Pickering J. (2016) Discover Life bee species guide and world checklist (Hymenoptera: Apoidea: Anthophila)  
Bohart, R.M., and A.S. Menke. 1976. Sphecid Wasps of the World: a Generic Revision. University of California Press.
Crawford, R.L. 1987. Spider prey of the mud-dauber, Sceliphron caementarium (Sphecidae), in Washington. Proceedings of the Washington State Entomological Society, 48: 797-800.
Evans, H.E., and M.J.West-Eberhard. 1970. The Wasps. University of Michigan Press.
Howard, L.O. 1903. The Insect Book. Doubleday.
Kevin M. O'Neill. 2000 - Solitary Wasps: Behavior and Natural History (Cornell Series in Arthropod Biology) - Comstock Publishing
Rau, Phil. 1916. The sleep of insects. Annals of the Entomological Society of America, 9: 227-275.
Roques A., Kenis M., Lees D., Lopez-Vaamonde C., Rabitsch W., Rasplus J.-Y., Roy D. - Alien terrestrial arthropods of Europe - BioRisk 4 Special Issue
Ross H. Arnett - American Insects: A Handbook of the Insects of America North of Mexico - CRC Press.  
Ross, K., and R. Matthews. 1991. The Social Biology of Wasps. Chapter 17, Evolution of Social Behavior in Sphecid Wasps, pp. 570–602.

External links 
 

Sphecidae
Biological pest control wasps
Insects described in 1773
Hymenoptera of Europe